Zelfana is a town and commune, coextensive with Zelfana District, in Ghardaïa Province, Algeria. According to the 2008 census it has a population of 10,161, up from 7,241 in 1998, with an annual growth rate of 3.5%.

Climate

Zelfana has a hot desert climate (Köppen climate classification BWh), with very hot summers and mild winters, and very little precipitation throughout the year.

Transportation

Zelfana is connected by a short  road to the N48 highway, which connects it to Ouargla to the east and the Trans-Sahara Highway or N1 to the west, near Noumerat Airport. The N1 connects to Ghardaïa to the north and to El Goléa and In Salah to the south.

Education

5.5% of the population has a tertiary education, and another 15.4% has completed secondary education. The overall literacy rate is 78.8%, and is 85.6% among males and 71.9% among females.

Localities
The commune of Zelfana is composed of five localities:

Centre de Zelfana
Village socialiste agricole et Centre Pétrolier de Oued Noumer
El Hesseï
Gouifla
La Palmeraie

References

Neighbouring towns and cities

Communes of Ghardaïa Province